Neijiang (Sichuanese Pinyin: Nui4jiang1;) is a prefecture-level city in the southeast of Sichuan province, People's Republic of China. It is located on the Tuo River, midway between the two major cities of Chengdu and Chongqing, is a transportation and food-processing center.
The population of the entire prefecture was 3,140,678 at the 2020 census, and the population of the built-up (metro) area was 1,179,140 in the 2 urban districts of Shizhong and Dongxing.

History

In medieval times the locality was an important salt-producing area, but in recent times its name has been associated with the cultivation of sugarcane; it is commonly referred to as the sugar capital （甜城） of Sichuan. During the economic boom of China in the 1990s and early 21st century, Neijiang has been transformed and its industries now range from engineering, electronics, chemicals, construction materials, to consumer goods. It is also the home of Neijiang Normal College and many other educational institutions. Its geographic location puts it in the center of the southern Sichuan transport network. Neijiang is also the hometown of Zhang Daqian, one of the best-known and most prodigious Chinese artists of the twentieth century.

Administrative divisions

Climate

Transportation
Neijiang railway station is situated on the Chengdu–Chongqing railway and is the most central. The Neijiang–Kunming railway also starts here. Neijiang North railway station is situated on the Chengdu–Chongqing intercity railway and is served by high-speed trains.

References

External links
Government of Neijiang

 
Cities in Sichuan
Prefecture-level divisions of Sichuan